"Paradise" (or "Theme from Paradise") is a song written and produced by L. Russell Brown and Joel Diamond that served as the theme to the 1982 adventure romance film Paradise. The theme is sung by American former actress Phoebe Cates and appears on her 1982 album of the same name. It was released as a single and reached number one in Italy. In 2001, American former singer Kaci covered the theme for her first studio album, Paradise (2001), and released it as her debut single the same year. Kaci's version became a hit in the United Kingdom, where it peaked at number 11 on the UK Singles Chart.

Track listings
US 7-inch single
A1. "Intro" – 0:05
A2. "Theme from Paradise – 3:53
B1. "Theme from Paradise (instrumental) – 3:53

International 7-inch single
A. "Theme from Paradise – 3:53
B. "Theme from Paradise (instrumental) – 3:53

Charts

Kaci version

American singer turned activist Kaci recorded the Paradise theme for her first album of the same name (2001) and released it as her debut single in February 2001, when she was 13 years old. Her version, produced by Diamond, reached number 11 on the UK Singles Chart and number 43 on the US Billboard Dance Singles Sales chart.

Chart performance
On March 4, 2001, "Paradise" debuted and peaked at number 11 on the UK Singles Chart. It spent nine weeks on the UK chart and was Kaci's highest-charting single until her cover of the Partridge Family's "I Think I Love You" reached number 10 in January 2002. The song ended 2001 as the UK's 124th-best-selling single. In Ireland, the song debuted at number 30 on March 1, 2001, and rose to its peak on number 10 during its fifth week on the chart, staying there for two weeks; it spent 11 weeks within the top 50. On the Eurochart Hot 100, "Paradise" debuted and peaked at number 47 on the issue of March 17, 2001. In the United States, the song appeared on the Billboard Hot Dance Singles Sales chart, where it reached number 43 on June 30, 2001.

Track listings

US CD single
 "Paradise" (radio edit) – 3:34
 "Paradise" (Motiv 8 Celestial radio edit) – 3:51
 "Un Paraiso" (Spanish version) – 4:01

UK CD single
 "Paradise" (Metro radio edit) – 3:36
 "Seventh Wonder of the World" (new mix) – 3:53
 "Paradise" (Motiv 8 Celestial radio edit) – 3:51
 "Paradise" (video) – 3:49

UK cassette single
 "Paradise" (Metro radio edit) – 3:36
 "Seventh Wonder of the World" (new mix) – 3:53

Australian CD single
 "Paradise" (Metro radio edit)
 "Seventh Wonder of the World" (new mix)
 "Paradise" (Motiv 8 Celestial radio edit)
 "Paradise" (Motiv 8 Celestial club mix)

Credits and personnel
Credits are taken from the US CD single liner notes.

Studio
 Recorded at Buffalo Sound

Personnel

 L. Russell Brown – writing
 Joel Diamond – writing, production, mixing, arranging
 Kaci – vocals
 MonaLisa Young – background vocals, vocal arrangement
 Will Wheaton – background vocals

 Bridgette Bryant – background vocals
 Adam Phillips – guitar
 Ted Perlman – instruments, mixing, arranging, engineering, programming
 Walter Turbitt – additional production, recording, programming

Charts

Weekly charts

Year-end charts

Release history

References

1982 debut singles
1982 songs
2001 debut singles
CBS Records singles
Columbia Records singles
Curb Records singles
Film theme songs
London Records singles
Number-one singles in Italy
Song recordings produced by Brian Rawling
Songs written by L. Russell Brown
Songs written for films